Haementeria ghilianii, the giant Amazon leech, is one of the world's largest species of leeches. It can grow to 450 mm (17.7 in) in length and 100 mm (3.9 in) in width. As adults, these leeches are a greyish-brown colour, as opposed to juveniles, which do not have a uniform colour, but rather, a noncontinuous stripe of colour, and patched colouring. They live from the Guianas to the Amazon. The leech produces the  anticoagulant protease hementin from its salivary glands.

It was thought to be extinct from the 1890s until the 1970s, when specimens were rediscovered in French Guiana by Dr Roy Sawyer. One of these leeches, dubbed Grandma Moses, founded a successful breeding colony at UC Berkeley.

References

Leeches